Devis Miorin (born 24 March 1976 in San Vito al Tagliamento) is an Italian former cyclist.

Major results
1997
1st Overall Giro della Valle d'Aosta
1998
1st Trofeo Alcide Degasperi
1999
1st Giro del Medio Brenta
2002
3rd Overall Uniqa Classic
1st Stage 1

References

1976 births
Living people
Italian male cyclists
People from the Province of Pordenone
Cyclists from Friuli Venezia Giulia